The Sebnitz is the left, larger headstream of the Lachsbach and runs through both the Czech Republic as well as the German state of Saxony. The upper section in the Czech Republic is known as Vilémovský potok in Czech and Wölmsdorfer Bach in German.

Geography 
The Sebnitz rises in the Šluknov Hook in a broad valley between the 608-metre-high Hrazený (Pirsken) and the 593-metre-high Plešný (Plissenberg), 2 kilometres northwest of the village of Brtníky (Zeidler). The stream flows in a northwesterly direction to Velký Šenov (Groß Schönau), where it swings southwest and follows the valley of Šenov stream, passing between Vilémov and Mikulášovice.

Below these villages the Wölmsdorfer Bach between the hills of Spálený vrch (Hillebrand, 443 m) and the Wolfstein (392.9 m) near Dolina (Franzthal) the stream forms the border between the Czech Republic and the tip of the Sebnitz Forest that throws a salient into Bohemian territory. From this section it is known as the Sebnitz or Sebnitzbach. With an average discharge of around  the Sebnitz can actually be considered the upper section of the Lachsbach, because the Polenz carries less water (discharge: ~). The lower part of the Sebnitz valley is largely known for being the route of the Sebnitz Valley Railway with its 7 tunnels.

Tributaries 
The most important tributaries of the Sebnitz are the:
Šenovský potok (Schönauer Bach), Velký Šenov
Liščí potok (Hainsbach), unterhalb Velký Šenov
Mikulášovičky potok (Nixdorfer Bach), Vilémov
Luční potok (Heimichbach), Dolní Poustevna
Finkenbach, Hofhainersdorf
Schönbach, Amtshainersdorf
Fischbach, below the Ulbersdorf Mill
Schwarzbach, by the Buttermilch Mill
Kohlichtgraben, by the Kohl Mill

Fauna 
Since 1995 there has been a cross-border project, the Elbe Lachs, which aims to reintroduce salmon to the Elbe and several of its tributaries, including the Sebnitz. This project has been successful and has resulted in salmon living in the Sebnitz again.

See also 
 List of rivers of Saxony
 List of rivers of the Czech Republic

References 

Rivers of Saxony
Rivers of the Ústí nad Labem Region
Bodies of water of Saxon Switzerland
Sebnitz
Rivers of Germany
International rivers of Europe
Border rivers
Czech Republic–Germany border